Sudeikiai is a town in Utena County, Lithuania. According to the 2011 census, the town had a population of 349.

References

Towns in Lithuania
Towns in Utena County
Novoalexandrovsky Uyezd
Utena District Municipality